The Missouri Capitol Police Department is a division of the Missouri Department of Public Safety consisting of 29 Sworn Peace Officers, and 3 civilian support staff.

 1 Chief of Police
 1 Captain
 2 Lieutenants
 5 Sergeants
 5 Corporals
 15 Officers
 1 Communications Operators
 1 Executive Assistant
 1 Police Clerk

This is split into three shifts and a 6 officer strong Executive Protection Detail responsible for close protection of the state governor and the Governor's Mansion

See also

 List of law enforcement agencies in Missouri
 Missouri State Highway Patrol
 Capitol police

References

External links
 Missouri Capitol Police
Publications by or about the Missouri Capitol Police at Internet Archive.

State law enforcement agencies of Missouri
Specialist police departments of Missouri
1935 establishments in Missouri
Capitol police